Sallux, formerly the European Christian Political Foundation (ECPF), is a political foundation at European level, and the official foundation/think tank of the European Christian Political Movement (ECPM), founded in 2011.
 
The ECPF supports and underpins the ECPM especially in terms of political content by European co-operation and the introduction of analysis, ideas and policy options. The ECPF shares the basic program and Christian values of the ECPM. The ECPF welcomes thinktanks, NGO's and individual politicians as members if they agree with these values and the Christian principles as expressed in the basic program.

The ECPF is based in Amersfoort, Netherlands., and the President of the Board is Davis Fieldsend from the United Kingdom.

Member states

References

External links
Official website

2011 establishments in the Netherlands
Think tanks established in 2011
Think tanks based in the Netherlands
European Christian Political Movement
Political and economic think tanks based in Europe
Political and economic research foundations
Political foundations at European level